{{DISPLAYTITLE:G12/G13 alpha subunits}}

G12/G13 alpha subunits are alpha subunits of heterotrimeric G proteins that link cell surface G protein-coupled receptors primarily to guanine nucleotide exchange factors for the Rho small GTPases to regulate the actin cytoskeleton. Together, these two proteins comprise one of the four classes of G protein alpha subunits. G protein alpha subunits bind to guanine nucleotides and function in a regulatory cycle, and are active when bound to GTP but inactive and associated with the G beta-gamma complex when bound to GDP. G12/G13 are not targets of pertussis toxin or cholera toxin, as are other classes of G protein alpha subunits.

G proteins G12 and G13 regulate actin cytoskeletal remodeling in cells during movement and migration, including cancer cell metastasis. G13 is also essential for receptor tyrosine kinase-induced migration of fibroblast and endothelial cells.

Genes
 GNA12
 GNA13

See also 
 Second messenger system
 G protein-coupled receptor
 Heterotrimeric G protein
 Gs alpha subunit
 Gi alpha subunit
 Gq alpha subunit
 Rho family of GTPases

References

External links
 

Peripheral membrane proteins